Cape Taputapu (Samoan: Tolotolo i Taputapu) is the name of a cape located in the Western District of American Samoa. Located in Tutuila, it is the island's westernmost point. The cape was designated as a National Natural Landmark in 1972.

Cape Taputapu is an important site in Samoan legends and also the location of a fruit bat colony. The coastline represents geologic features and an important habitat for intertidal flora and fauna. Taputapu is also the name of a nearby islet known as Taputapu Island.

Taputapu means forbidden in Samoan, and the cape was named so as it was the only site on Tutuila where paper mulberry trees were found. The discoverers wanted to keep the site and bark for themselves so they could sell it to other parts of American Samoa.

The cape's shoreline features volcanic rocks and blowholes created by the strong wave activity which also created Tutuila Island as a whole. It can be hiked during times of low tide, from a trail located in the village of Poloa. The cape is the last place on Tutuila where the sun sets.

See also
List of National Natural Landmarks in American Samoa
Taputapu Island

References

Landforms of American Samoa
Headlands of Oceania
National Natural Landmarks in American Samoa